Pasterka is a Christmas midnight mass celebrated in Poland.

Pasterka may also refer to:
 Pasterka, Lower Silesian Voivodeship, a village in Kłodzko County, Lower Silesian Voivodeship (SW Poland)